The Schalihorn (3,975 m) is a mountain of the Swiss Pennine Alps, located between Zinal and Täsch in the canton of Valais. It is separated from the Zinalrothorn by the Moming Pass (3,777 m) and from the Weisshorn by the Schalijoch (3,750 m).

References

External links
 Schalihorn on SummitPost
 Schalihorn on Hikr

Mountains of the Alps
Alpine three-thousanders
Mountains of Switzerland
Mountains of Valais
Three-thousanders of Switzerland